Several cruise ships have carried the name Royal Princess:

 , in service as MV Royal Princess from 1984 until 2005
 Azamara Pursuit, in service as MV Royal Princess from 2007 until 2011
 , launched in 2012

See also
 , whose lead ship was Royal Princess
 
 

Ship names